Victor Pernac (23 December 1920 – 27 March 2016) was a French racing cyclist. He rode in the 1947 and 1948 Tour de France. He finished in eighth place in the 1946 Paris–Roubaix.

References

External links
 

1920 births
2016 deaths
French male cyclists
Cyclists from Marseille